This is a timeline of the 2006 Lebanon War during the month of July.

12 July

13 July

14 July

15 July

16 July

17 July

18 July

19 July

20 July

21 July

22 July

23 July

24 July

25 July

26 July

27 July

28 July

29 July

30 July

31 July

References

2006 Lebanon War
2006 Lebanon War (July)